The University of St Andrews Union Debating Society is a student debating society at the University of St Andrews in Scotland. Tracing its origins back to 1794 and established in 1890, it is one of the oldest debating societies of its kind in the English-speaking world. It also holds weekly public debates in the Lower Parliament Hall, which are free and open to all students - the only Scottish Debating Society to do this.

In 2015, the society became the first in Scotland to win the European Universities Debating Championship, a competition that they compete at every year.

The society's motto remains to be "pro amicitia et litteris" meaning "for friendship and learning".

History

Founding
The origins of the University of St Andrews Debating Society can be traced to the formation in 1794 of the university Literary Society. However the society suffered from a lack of sufficient funding, so much so that apart from joining and annual fees, much of the Society's income came from the imposition of fees for lateness, absence, or the use of 'improper language'. At this stage of its history, the Literary Society operated under a strange mixture of egalitarianism and exclusiveness. Initially, there was no president of the Society and meetings were chaired by each member in rotation. The only distinct posts allowed were that of Secretary and Treasurer. In addition, all decisions were taken collectively by the Society as a whole. However, membership was limited to twenty-five students, was strictly by election, and no 'strangers' were permitted to attend debates. In 1846, The Classical Society, a rival debating society, was re-established and was soon vying with the Literary Society for the attention of the student body. However, it soon became apparent that there were simply not enough students at the university to justify the existence of two debating societies and consequently in 1890 the Classical Society and Literary Society merged to form the Union Debating Society.

Development
The acquisition of James Crichton's House by the fledgling Students' Union afforded the Society a permanent home, although the two organisations had no official ties. This, and the fact that the Union Debating Society now had over seventy members (a third of the total student population), gave the Society renewed confidence and a greater importance than ever before in the lives of students.

In 1898 the Society decided to form Debates Board, in order to manage the running of the society, it consisted of an honorary president, two honorary vice-presidents, a secretary, a treasurer, a "general committee" of four members, a 'College Echoes' Reporting Committee, and a Debates Committee of four members. In 1910 the post of president of the Union Debating Society was created. In 1925 the Union Debating Society agreed to be affiliated to the Students' Union, and all matriculated students of the university would be members. The chair of the Union Debating Society would be elected as the Union Convenor of Debates, and debating would be done completely under the auspices of the Students' Union. The Debates Board ceased to exist, and the title of 'President of the Union Debating Society' was kept purely as a courtesy title.

In 1932 the society elected to re-create the Debates Board, in order to regain some independence from the Students' Union. It was to consist of the Convenor of Debates and two clerks to the house. During this period debates were held in the council chamber of the Men's Students' Union, apart from some large-scale events, which were held in the Union Diner.

In the 1970s, the move of the Students' Union from its original home to a new purpose built building provided the Union Debating Society with the opportunity to make a move of its own. The Convenor of Debates took the opportunity to move debates to Lower College Hall in St Salvator's Quadrangle, and then to Lower Parliament Hall in St Mary's Quadrangle.

This physical move away from the Students' Union was accompanied by an organisational one. In 1979, the society decided to change the Debating Sub-Committee into the 'Debating Board of Ten'. This new sub-committee comprised the convenor, chairman of ways and means, sergeant-at-arms, clerk to the house, treasurer, steward, two ordinary members, union president, and a further representative from the Union Committee. The president would continue to be elected as the convenor of debates, but the Board of Ten would be elected in an annual general meeting of the Union Debating Society.

The Society today
Today the Union Debating Society continues to fulfil its primary mission of holding regular debates in Lower Parliament Hall,. 
These occur every Thursday on a weekly basis during term time. In recent years, turnout at the Society's debates has been good drawing in speakers from across the UK and, occasionally, from abroad. These weekly debates are available for all to attend. The classic St Andrews Gown is traditionally worn by attendees, with the President of the society wearing the Debates President gown. These public debates are organised by the President and their Public Debates Sub-Committee.

The Union Debating Society also has a highly successful Inter-Varsity wing. Major successes include reaching the final of the European Universities Debating Championships in 2007 and winning a number of domestic competitions. The Union Debating Society has also had teams reach the semi-finals of the 2007, 2008, 2012 and 2013 World Universities Debating Championships, with several alumni reaching the finals in 2013, and has also performed well in the John Smith Memorial Mace. At the Vienna 2015 European Championships, Alex Don and Ruairidh MacIntosh placed first and second respectively on the speaker tab and were the first team from a Scottish institution to win the competition. More recent successes include two St Andrews teams reaching the gold final of the National Scottish Mace in 2022; a St Andrews team winning the Oxford IV Novice Final 2021; and a St Andrews team winning the Durham IV 2022. The Union Debating Society regularly sends two teams to the European Universities Debating Championships and to the World Universities Debating Championships with team slots available for anyone in the University to trial for.

Organisation

The Union Debating Society consists of the Board of Ten and then the Competitive Debates Subcommittee and the Public Debates Subcommittee. Together these compose the entire Debates Board and are composed solely of St Andrews students. All positions (save the Media, Treasurer and Equity officers) are elected in the AGM held in Spring. All matriculated students are able to run for any of these positions and equally all are able to vote in the AGM.

The Board of Ten is led and chaired by the President and Convener and consists of: President and Convener; the Treasurer; the Chief Whip; the Chair of Ways and Means; the Clerk; the Media Officers (2); and the Equity Officers (2); the DosDA (Director of Student Development and Activities); and the Parent(s) of the House. The Board of Ten is responsible for the overarching organisation of the Society and serves as the executive committee of the Union Debating Society. They meet weekly and minutes of these meetings are collected and kept with records dating back almost a century.

The Competitive Debates Subcommittee is chaired by the Chief Whip and consists of: the Chief Whip; the Competitions Secretary; the Training Officer; and the Schools Officer. They are responsible for organising all inter-varsity competitive affairs including competition attendance, internal training sessions, and school outreach. They are responsible for organising the regular training sessions that take place on Wednesday afternoons as well as the advanced training sessions for international competitions. Equally, they organise which inter-varsity competitions are attended and who attends - with the aim to allow every student who shows an interest the ability to attend at least one IV competition a semester. The Schools Outreach program has seen considerable revision in recent years. The annual and prestigious St Andrews Schools Competition is run for any Scottish Schools to send teams to. In recent years, the Union Debating Society has aided First Chances set up regular debate training as part of their offering to underprivileged identified pupils in Fife. The Competitive Debates Subcommittee meet weekly, with the Chief Whip representing the Subcommittee at Board of Ten meetings.

The Public Debates Subcommittee is chaired by the Chair of Ways and Means and consists of: the Chair of Ways and Means; the Serjeant-at-Arms; the Steward; and the Public Debates Secretary. They are responsible for the planning and organising of the wider society interaction with the St Andrews University student community. This consists of organising the weekly public debates - drawing in a wide-range of prominent external speakers - and organising all of the social affairs of the society. The Public Debates Subcommittee meet weekly, with the Chair of Ways and Means representing the Subcommittee at Board of Ten meetings.

Traditions
The Society has a number of traditions, many going back decades or even centuries. At the start of a debate the convenor welcomes those gathered to the current session of 'the University of St Andrews Union Debating Society, the oldest and, some might say, the finest of its kind in the world' — this brings a resounding cheer of 'hear hear'.

At debates students wear academic gowns including the scarlet gowns of the United College, the black of St Mary's College, the black postgraduate gowns of St Leonard's College, or an appropriate graduate gown.

On the basis that the Society has always claimed to have provided good value for money (unlike other student debating societies like the Oxford Union or Durham Union, both membership and attendance at debates are free to all students) when a monetary amount is mentioned in a speech, those attending the debate cry "How much?"; the sum is then repeated, to which the audience responds "That's cheap!".

The minutes are read at the beginning of each debate in a caricature style of some relevant figure, but inevitably someone would rather proceed to the main debate, and so raises a point of order, moving that the minutes be taken as read; another member rises in opposition to the motion.  At this stage a vote is taken by 'oral acclamation' — the announcement of which is met with a cry of 'Oohh', and after a vote the convenor generally believes to be closer than is apparent to the rest of the House (who nearly always believe that the 'nays' have it, which would result in the minutes being read in full), the minutes are taken as read, and the convenor requested to 'resign' on the basis of having effectively overruled the House.

The society's motto is Pro Amicitia Et Litteris — 'for friendship and learning'.  The Gaudeamus used to be sung at the end of each debate, as the Board of Ten and speakers process out of the chamber but now they simply rise and leave at the command of the President.

The Society also owns a sword, affectionately known as Bessie, which is said to be used by the Sergeant at Arms to protect the authority of the speaker: in practice it symbolises the authority of the House, in the manner of a ceremonial mace.

Notable presidents
 1933-34 George Kennedy Young
 1958-59 John MacGregor
 1973-74 Eamonn F. Butler
 1974-75 Eamonn F. Butler
 1992-93 Ian Duncan

See also
 Graham Stewart The Union Debating Society 1794–1990: A History of Debating at St Andrews University (D.C. Thomson)

References

External links
 

1890 establishments in Scotland
Student organizations established in 1890
St Andrews Union Debating Society, University of
Union Debating Society